The Colorado State University Fight Song, known as "Stalwart Rams", is the official fight song for Colorado State University.  Features of its uniqueness include the use of the word "stalwart," meaning unrelenting and full of ardor, and the third line of the song which allows the fight song to be adapted for each game, from "tear the Buffaloes' line asunder" to "tear the Cowboys' line asunder."

The CSU Fight Song is commonly followed immediately by the "Spell Yell," a song in which the band and fans spell the word "Rams."

History
The "Colorado State University Fight Song" was written by Richard F. Bourne and first performed in 1932. The original lyrics were slightly different than the current ones, including the line "fight on ye stalwart aggies" as the Colorado State Rams were referred to as the Aggies during this time. Several other fight songs were used throughout the years such as the "Aggie Boom Song" which was adopted in 1937 as the official song of the Colorado A&M Aggies. The lyrics of the fight song were modified to include the newly adopted "Rams" name when Colorado A&M changed its name to Colorado State University in 1957.

Lyrics

Notes

References

External links
 CSURams.com

 Listen to the Colorado State University Fight Song

 The CSU Fight Song and Spell Yell

 A circa 1953 recording of the fight song

 A circa 1953 recording of the "Aggie Boom Song"

American college songs
College fight songs in the United States
Mountain West Conference fight songs
Colorado State University